Taylor Grey is an American singer-songwriter currently signed to Kobalt Music Group. In 2018, Taylor won Best Pop Album of the Year for her debut album Space Case and Best Pop Song of the Year for Miami at the 16th Annual Independent Music Awards.

Background
Taylor Grey was born and raised in Northern California and currently attends Stanford University majoring in psychology while balancing her music career.

Career

In 2016, released debut EP, Mind of Mine, followed by the release of Mind of Mine II EP. Toured with The X Factor contestant, Jacob Whitesides on his Lovesick Tour, and later joined The Summer Set on their Made For You Tour.

Taylor first garnered media and public attention from the release of her first single on February 17, 2017, Never Woulda Letcha followed by her second single released in late May 2017, Miami.

On June 16, 2017, Taylor released her award-winning debut album Space Case, executive produced by award-winning producer, Josh Abraham. The album was produced and engineered by Grammy nominated producer, Nico Stadi. 

Taylor joined Jacob Whitesides again in the summer of 2017 on his Basically Happy Tour in Northern America and Canada.

In May 2019, Taylor released her EP including Back to Bite and Intentionally.

In early 2019 Taylor went back on the road for select dates joining The Vamps in the UK and New Hope Club in the United States.
Taylor recently joined Why Don't We on the US tour throughout the summer of 2019, and continued on with them throughout Europe and Australia to finish out the year.

References 

Living people
American women singer-songwriters
Stanford University alumni
Year of birth missing (living people)
American singer-songwriters
21st-century American women